Rolf Drechsler is an electrical engineer at the University of Bremen, Germany. He was named a Fellow of the Institute of Electrical and Electronics Engineers (IEEE) in 2015 for his contributions in testing and verification of electronic circuits and systems.

References

Fellow Members of the IEEE
Living people
Year of birth missing (living people)
Place of birth missing (living people)